Premiere on Pine (formerly known as 815 Pine) is a  tall residential skyscraper in Seattle, Washington. The building, designed by Weber Thompson and developed by Holland Partners Group, has 40 floors and is located at Pine Street and 9th Avenue, adjacent to the Paramount Theatre and Convention Place station. Construction on the building began in August 2012, topping off in March 2014. Leasing began in December 2014.

As of July 2021, Premiere on Pine is managed & leased by Bozzuto Management Company

See also
List of tallest buildings in Seattle

References

External links

Official Premiere on Pine website

Residential skyscrapers in Seattle
Residential buildings completed in 2014
2014 establishments in Washington (state)